Tegal Regency is one of the regencies in the northwest part of Central Java province of Indonesia, with an area of . The administrative center used to be in Tegal City, in the northwest corner of the regency, but then Tegal City was administratively separated from the regency and formed into its own territory. The regency had a population of 1,394,839 at the 2010 Census and 1,596,996 at the 2020 Census.

History 
The name of Tegal comes from the word Tetegal which means fertile soil capable of producing agricultural crops. Another source states, Tegal name is believed to come from the word Teteguall. The name given by a trader from Portugal named Tome Pires who stopped at the Port of Tegal in the 1500s.

Tegal regency was established on 18 May 1601 when Ki Gede Sebayu was appointed as a Juru Demung in Tegal by the Sultan of Mataram, and began to build this area.

Geography 
The northern part of Tegal Regency is lowland. While in the southern part is a mountain, Mount Slamet, rising to a peak of 3,428 m2.
At the border with Pemalang Regency, there are a series of steep hills down which large rivers flow, namely Kali Gung and Kali Erang, both of which are water-eyed upstream of Mount Slamet.

Geographic location 
Tegal Regency is located in the northwest part of Central Java province, with geographical location 108° 57 ' 06" - 109° 21' 30" E and 6° 02' 41" - 7° 15' 30" S. Tegal Regency has a strategic location that are in the road of Semarang - Tegal - Cirebon and Semarang - Tegal - Purwokerto - Cilacap, with port facilities located in Tegal City.

Boundaries 
The boundaries of Tegal Regency are:

Administrative division 
Administratively, Tegal Regency is divided into 18 districts (kecamatan), which are sub-divided into administrative villages - 281 rural villages (desa) and 6 urban villages (kelurahan). The districts are listed below with their areas and their populations at the 2010 Census and the 2020 Census. The table also includes the number of administrative villages (rural desa and urban kelurahan) in each district, and the location of its administrative centre.

From its establishment, the administrative center of Tegal Regency was located in Tegal City. However, following the issuance of Government Regulation No. 2/1984, its administrative centre was moved from the Tegal City area to Slawi. Beginning in late 1989, Slawi was developed into the capital of Tegal Regency. 
The districts and villages (rural desa and urban kelurahan) in Tegal Regency are:

Government

Regents of Tegal Regency

From Mataram era to Dutch East Indies era
 Ki Gede Sebayu (Democrat) is level with Regent (1601 - 1620) Buried in Danawarih Village, Balapulang District.
 Ki Gede Honggowono (Democrat) is level with Regent (1620 - 1625) Buried in Kalisoka Village, Dukuhwaru district.
 Prince Duke Arya Martoloyo "The First Duke of Tegal" (1625 - 1678).
 Tumenggung Sindurejo aka Pranantaka aka Gendowor (1678 - 1679).
 Tumenggung Honggowono aka Duke Reksonegoro I (1679 - 1680).
 Tumenggung Secowijoyo (1680 - 1697).
 Tumenggung Secomenggolo (1697 - 1700).
 Raden Mas Tumenggung Tritonoto (1700 - 1702).
 Tumenggung Bodroyudho Secowardoyo I aka Duke Reksonegoro II (1702 - 1746).
 Tumenggung Bodroyudho Secowardoyo II aka Duke Reksonegoro III (1746 - 1776) Buried in Kalisoka Village, Dukuhwaru district.
 Tumenggung Kartoyudho aka Duke Reksonegoro IV (1776 - 1800).
 Raden Mas Panji Haji Cokronegoro IV (1800 - 1816) Buried in Semedo Village, Kedungbanteng district.
 Tumenggung Surenggono (1816) Died after being appointed as Tumenggung.
 Tumenggung Surodiwongso aka Tumenggung Suronegoro (1816 - 1819).
 Tumenggung Secomenggolo (1819 - 1821).
 Raden Mas Arya Haji Reksonegoro VI (1821 - 1857).
 Tumenggung Sosronegoro (1857 - 1858).
 Raden Mas Ronggo Surodipuro (1858 - 1862).
 Raden Tumenggung Widyoningrat (1862 - 1864).
 R. Tumenggung Panji Sosrokusumo (1864 - 1869).
 R.M. Ore (R.M.A. Reksonegoro VII) (1869 - 18 ...).
 R.M. Kis (R.M.A. Reksonegoro VIII) (... - 1903) Buried In Pesarean Village, Adiwerna District.
 R.M. Suyitno (R.M.A. Reksonegoro IX) (1903 - 1929).
 R.M. Susmono (R.M.A. Reksonegoro X) (1929 - 1935).
 J. Patih R. Subiyanto (1935 - 1937).
 R. Tumenggung Slamet Kertonegoro (1937 - 1942).

From the Japanese colonial era to the Old Order era, the New Order era and the Reformation era
 Mr. Moh. Great Mertokusumo (concurrently Burgermester) (1942 - 1944).
 Raden Sunaryo (1944 - 1945).
 Kyai Abu Sujai "As the First Ulama who became the Regent" (1945 - 1946) Buried In Talang Village, Talang District.
 Prawoto Sudibyo (1946 - 1948)
 R. Soeputro (1948 - 1949)
 R.M. Susmono Reksonegoro (1949 - 1950)
 R.M. Sumindro (1950 - 1955)
 R.M. Projosumarto (1955 - 1960)
 Sutoro (1960 - 1966)
 Munadi (January 1966 - December 1966)
 R. Sutarjo (December 1966 - December 1967)
 Col. R. Soepadhi Joedodarmo (1967 - 1973)
 Lieutenant Colonel. R. Samino Sastrosuwignyo (1973 - 1977)
 Drs. Herman Sumarmo (Ymt) (1977 - 1978)
 Hasyim Dirjosubroto (1978 - 1989)
 Drs. H. Wienachto (1989 to 1991)
 Drs. Sudiatno (January 1991 - August 1991)
 Drs. H. Soetjipto (August 1991 - July 1998)
 Drs. Setiawan Sadono (Plt) (July 1998 - June 1999)
 Drs. H. Soediharto (June 1999 - January 2004)
 Agus Riyanto, S.Sos, M.M. (January 2004 - August 2011)
 H.M. Heri Soelistiawan, S.H., M.Hum. (August 2011 - May 2013)
 Drs. Haron Bagas Prakosa, M.Hum. (Plt Regent of Tegal) (May 2013 - June 2013)
 Ir. Satriyo Widodo (Plt.) (June 2013 - October 2013)
 Ki Enthus Susmono, Ph.D. (October 2013 - Now)

Population 
Tegal Regency is the 21st most densely populated regency in Central Java based on the 2016 official estimates. The main population distribution lies to the south of Tegal City and along the Tegal - Slawi Highway.

Language 
In daily life, the people of Tegal Regency use Banyumasan-Javanese Language with Tegalese dialect, which is now known as Tegalese Language.

Economy

Home industry
The people of Tegal Regency have many businesses in the home industry sector, including casting, metalworking, textile, shuttlecock, furniture, and pottery. There are also industrial plants of chalk and powder raw materials in the area of Margasari District as the main supplier of powder in Tegal Regency.

Agriculture and plantation
The people of Tegal Regency also work in agriculture and plantation sectors, especially in the southern part of Tegal regency especially in the district of Bumijawa and Bojong.

Marine and fisheries
In the marine and fisheries sector, coastal residents, especially in Suradadi Subdistrict, work as fishermen in Java Sea to South China Sea including (Riau Islands). The catches are sold to the fishing port of Jakarta, Cirebon, Pekalongan and Tegal City. Coastal residents of Tegal Regency are also many who open shrimp farming business, and milkfish (also the sale of seeds).

Livestock
In the livestock sector, the people of Tegal Regency have many businesses in the field of poultry farms, like Tegal Duck (Indian Runner) for the supply of salted egg industry in Brebes. In the countryside there are also goat, cow and buffalo, which are traditionally cultivated.

The Tegal Stall
The people of Tegal Regency are also many who go to work to other cities in Java Island especially in Jakarta and to other islands. Most of the business opened is Tegal Stall (Indonesian : Warung Tegal or "warteg") which is incorporated in Cooperative of Tegal Stalls (Indonesian : Koperasi Warung Tegal or "Kowarteg"), that selling martabak telur (from Lebaksiu District), and others. The days before Idul Fitri, the people of Tegal Regency go home from the region where they work to meet their family and bring the money from their work/ business.

Education 
Schools in Tegal Regency include the following:

Level junior high school

Level senior high school

Level college

Level Islamic Boarding School

Tourism

Tourism site
 Guci Hot Water Bath (Guci Tourism Site), located in Bumijawa District on the slopes of Mount Slamet, about 30 km from Slawi town.In Guci there are 10 waterfalls. Among them are Bath 13 and Shower 7, local residents often soak and bathe, because it is believed to cure skin diseases. In Guci also available the horses for rent to go sightseeing enjoy the scenery around. This tourism site is available a variety of facilities such as lodging (hotels and villas), forest tours, heated swimming pool, tennis court and football as well as the campground. Horses are also available to rent. Jedor Waterfall is upland.
 Purwahamba Indah (Purin) Beach, located in Suradadi Subdistrict on North Coast road.
 Cacaban Lake, located in Kedungbanteng subdistrict.
 Mount Sitanjung, located in Lebaksiu subdistrict which is a sacred place in the Great Day of Java and Islam.
 Curug Cantel, is the highest waterfall in Tegal Regency with a height of about 70 meters located in Bumijawa subdistrict.
 Mount Batu, located in Batuagung village in Tegal Regency, stretches from south to north, and from west to east.
 Beko Lake, a green lake due to a mixture of sulfur and surrounded by limestone mountains. This tourist attraction is located in Margasari District.
 Hanging Bridge at Kaligung Dam, Danawarih village, near Ki Gede Sebayu tomb.

Interesting place
 Slawi Square, is a large park with a large fountain located in the center of Slawi Town right in front of the Pendopo of Tegal Regency.
 Slawi People's Park in Procot, Slawi Town.
 MAKO BRIGIF-4 (Infantry Brigade Command Headquarters), Slawi Town.
 Radar Unit 214/Tegal, (Indonesian: Satuan Radar 214/Tegal), is an air defense element located directly under the National Air Defense Sector Command I. It is located in the northern region of Central Java Province in charge of carrying out air defense operations, especially the National air observations. It is further said that Radar Unit 214/Tegal in its main duty has full authority in maintaining sovereignty in the air with all the capabilities it possesses.This radar unit formerly was named "Radar Unit 214/Pemalang". The change of the Radar Unit name is based on the Decree of the Chief of Staff of the Air Force No. Kep-1046/XII/2015 issued on December 15, 2015. In addition, the change of name of Radar Unit is also on the consideration of the territorial aspect in which this Unit is in Tegal Regency so that the use of the Radar Unit of Pemalang name is not relevant anymore with the current condition.
 Tri Sanja Stadium, Persekat (Tegal Regency Football United) Headquarters.
 Mount Gantungan, in Jatinegara subdistrict, where several towers relay TV stations.
 Slutu Mlaku is an agro tourism located in Kedungsukun village, Adiwerna subdistrict. Businesses include Kedungsukun Market and Herlan's Babbling Bird Studio.

Educational tourism
 Gerakan Banteng Nasional (GBN) Struggle Monument, located in Procot, Slawi Town right in front of Poci Monument Roundabout.
 Ancient Human Site Semedo, is a site of ancient humans and ancient animals located in Semedo village, Kedungbanteng.

Religious tourism
 Surau Ponolawen, is a place for pilgrimage, there is a sacred tomb that is said to be the tomb of Sheikh spreader of Islam first in the area, located in Pagiyanten village bordering Kedungsukun village, Adiwerna.

Shopping Center
 Yogya Slawi Department Store, (Formerly Dedy Jaya Plaza), located at Jl.Ahmad Yani, Slawi Town.
 Mutiara Cahaya (MC), the first supermarket in downtown of Slawi Town.
 Slawi Commercial Center, located in downtown of Slawi Townbuilt in 2002.
 Banjaran Permai, located in Tembok Banjaran village, Adiwerna.
 Trayeman Market, is the oldest traditional market in Tegal Regency, located in Trayeman, Slawi Town.

Worship place
 Great Mosque of Tegal Regency.

Spot photos
 Torch Statue Roundabout, in Pakembaran.
 Poci Monument Roundabout, in Slawi Town.
 Pujasera Park, in Slawi Town.

Historic site
 Slawi 3 Elementary School (formerly Putri Elementary School) (Dutch heritage).
 Procot 1 Elementary School (Dutch heritage), at Jl. Nangka No. 3 Procot, Slawi Town.
 Pangkah Sugar Factory, in Pangkah subdistrict.

Culinary

Typical food
 Bogana Rice - Rice-like rice megon.
 Bongkok Ketupat - Ketupat from the village of Bongkok.
 Blengong Sate - Sate whose meat comes from animal crosslinking between duck and mentok (blengong).
 Duck Majir Sate
 Glabed Ketupat
 Kemronyos - Typical Sate Tegal
 Kupat Sambel Tahu Lengko Mbah Pa'ong - Typical food from Margasari, Tegal | Margasari] area. Made from natural rice wrapped in coconut leaves with a shape like urung. And mixed with bean sprouts, chunks [aci tofu], sprinkled with extra spicy peanut sauce and sprinkled with fried onions and yellow noodle crackers. Kupat Sambel Tahu Lengko from the next generation of Mbah Pa'ong can still be found at Wak Dakum kiosk in Margasari Market complex.
 Mendoan - Fried flour tempeh with seasoning, it's fried and undercooked. As a drinking companion with Poci Tea and it's served with soy sauce and mixed with cayenne pepper. Mendoan can also be found in Banyumasan area.
 Ponggol Devil Rice
 Ponggol Rice
 Rujak teplak - Rujak with a tape sauce.
 Sega lengko - Rice with complementary ingredients such as tempeh, tofu sliced dice, bean sprouts, raw cabbage, and peanut sauce along with crackers.
 Tegal Sate - Sate young goat with soy chili sauce.
 Tegal Soto - Chicken soto / goat soto from Tegal with spice tauco and bean sprouts.
Typical Drink
 Poci Tea is a tea that is brewed in a pot made of clay and drunk with stone sugar. Slogan of Poci Tea is "wasgitel" meaning wangi, panas, sepet, legi lan kentel (Eng : fragrant, hot, spicy, sweet, and thick), Tegal regency until now also known as a tea-producing center.

Tegal typical snacks

Fried food and snack food
 Aci Tofu
 Anthor Crackers - Crackers made from cassava fried with coconut pulp (sand kaligung). To enjoy it must provide a drink because if you eat this cracker then the throat will feel hoarse.
 Bogares Salted Peanuts - Snacks of marinated peanuts, this snack comes from the village of Bogares Kidul.
 Ear Tofu - Ear Tofu is given a dough of tapioca starch and shaped like an ear which is then fried.
 Gejos - Food made from grated-cassava which is filled with red sugar.
 Olos - This snack is made of flour and formed round, then filled with sliced cabbage, onion and cayenne pepper. Then fried to harden for make it crispy. This food comes from Jatirawa village. Origin of this snack that originated when the inventor of this food sold the rissoles in Jatirawa, and then there were some kids who were buying it, but what they called is not the word "rissoles" but "oles", so this food is finally called olos. it is like a rissoles in general but because there were buyers who did not like carrots or bean sprouts, finally these foods were filled with cabbage and chilli alone, as well as made into a round-shaped creations.
 Opak - A thin round meal made from cassava, can also be eaten with chili sauce.
 Pilus - Snack made of wheat and small sphere-shaped.
 Petis - Food made from squeezed soybean juice that is then crushed and given chili pepper and then cooked. Petis can also be cooked with chicken bones or goat bones to make it more enjoyable.
 Plethok Tofu

Various cakes
 Bongko Cake
 Jenang / Dodol Glempang
 Lolom Cake
 Martabak Lebaksiu
 Semprong
 Talam Cake
 Topsy-Turvy Gemblong
 Wrinkles

References

External links

 

Regencies of Central Java